Sphere packing in a sphere is a three-dimensional packing problem with the objective of packing a given number of equal spheres inside a unit sphere. It is the three-dimensional equivalent of the circle packing in a circle problem in two dimensions.

References

Spheres
Packing problems